Michele Dotrice (born 27 September 1948) is an English actress. She portrayed Betty Spencer, the long-suffering wife of Frank Spencer, portrayed by Michael Crawford, in the BBC sitcom Some Mothers Do 'Ave 'Em, which ran from 1973 to 1978, and returned in 2016 for a special.

Career
Her first significant role was in the 1962 13-part BBC TV adaptation of The Old Curiosity Shop in which she played Nell, and she appeared in The Witches for Hammer Films in 1966. In 1970 she had starring roles in the horror thrillers And Soon the Darkness (1970) and The Blood on Satan's Claw (1970). Her other film appearances include Jane Eyre (1970) with George C. Scott and the 1976 comedy Not Now, Comrade.

It was her appearance in Some Mothers Do 'Ave 'Em that made her a household name, and she played the role for five years from 1973. In February 2016, the BBC announced that she was to reprise the role in a one-off special to be broadcast as part of the Sport Relief charity fundraiser event.

Her other 1970s roles include Felicity in the Jason King episode "Buried in the Cold Cold Ground", and Lady Percy in the BBC productions of Henry IV, Part 1 and Part 2 in 1979.

In 1981 she took the leading role in the short-lived sitcom Chintz, which aired on ITV. In 1987, Dotrice played the role of a new mother whose child was snatched in an episode of The Equalizer along with her future husband Edward Woodward. In the mid-1990s she appeared for several episodes in the period drama Bramwell. She appeared in the film Captain Jack (1999) with Bob Hoskins. She has made numerous guest appearances in well-known British television series, including Midsomer Murders (1 episode, 1998), Holby City (1 episode, 2002), Murder in Suburbia (as Cindy in Episode 6, Season 2, 2005), and the BBC daytime soap opera Doctors (1 episode, 2008). In addition, she made several appearances in a 2004 BBC comedy-drama entitled A Thing Called Love, set in Nottingham, which starred Paul Nicholls and Roy Barraclough among others.

In 2012 she toured in The Ladykillers, playing the role of Mrs Wilberforce. In 2014, she played Pam Chandler, a suspected murderer, in the last episode of series three of Death in Paradise. In 2015, she played Marion, mother to Christine in the "Inside No. 9" episode The 12 Days of Christine. In 2016, she played Nancy, the faithful dresser and woman of all work to the main character, in the West End production of Nell Gwynn. In 2017 she played Jessie in the stage musical The Girls at the Phoenix Theatre in the West End.

In 2018 she returned to television playing Edna Friendship in A Very English Scandal. 

ITV launched their new drama in 2020 McDonald & Dodds in which she played Mary Costair in the second episode of Series 1.

Personal life
Her parents were the actors Roy Dotrice and Kay Dotrice. She has two sisters, Karen Dotrice and Yvette Dotrice, who followed their parents into acting.

Dotrice was married to actor Edward Woodward from January 1987 until his death in November 2009. They have a daughter named Emily Beth.

Filmography

Film

Television

References

External links
 

1948 births
Living people
20th-century English actresses
21st-century English actresses
Actresses from Lincolnshire
British comedy actresses
English child actresses
English film actresses
English stage actresses
English television actresses
People from Cleethorpes